Mosalsky Uyezd (Моса́льский уе́зд ) was one of the subdivisions of the Kaluga Governorate of the Russian Empire. It was situated in the western part of the governorate. Its administrative centre was Mosalsk.

Demographics
At the time of the Russian Empire Census of 1897, Mosalsky Uyezd had a population of 151,928. Of these, 99.7% spoke Russian and 0.2% Yiddish as their native language.

References

 
Uezds of Kaluga Governorate
Kaluga Governorate